The Graaff Baronetcy, of Cape Town in the Cape of Good Hope Province of the Union of South Africa, is a title in the Baronetage of the United Kingdom. It was created on 6 February 1911 for the South African businessman and politician David Pieter de Villiers Graaff. His son, the second Baronet, was also a politician and served as Leader of the United Party between 1956 and 1977.

The baronetcy is one of twelve conferred on South Africans between 1841 and 1924.

Graaff baronets, of Cape Town (1911)
Sir David Pieter de Villiers Graaff, 1st Baronet (1859–1931)
Sir De Villiers "Div" Graaff, 2nd Baronet (1913–1999)
Sir David de Villiers Graaff, 3rd Baronet (1940–2015)
Sir De Villiers Graaff, 4th Baronet (born 1970)

Other Graaffs
Jacobus Arnoldus Graaff (1863–1927): Sir David Graaff, 1st Baronet's younger brother and business partner. Jacobus was also an influential politician and government minister.
Johannes de Villiers Graaff (1928–2015): Sir David Graaff, 1st Baronet's youngest son and noted South African welfare economist.

See also 
 Baron de Villiers

Notes

References
Kidd, Charles, Williamson, David (editors). Debrett's Peerage and Baronetage (1990 edition). New York: St Martin's Press, 1990, 

Baronetcies in the Baronetage of the United Kingdom
Graaff family